Edward Ernest Hartman (August 25, 1964 – October 3, 2003) was convicted of the 1993 murder of Herman Smith, Sr. and was executed via lethal injection in 2003 by the State of North Carolina at Central Prison in Raleigh, North Carolina. 

Hartman confessed to the crime but requested a life sentence. According to The News & Observer, five mitigating factors were presented at Hartman's trial, including alcoholism (he claimed to be severely intoxicated at the time of the murder) and childhood abuse. The jury felt that these factors were outweighed by Hartman's theft of Smith's car and money. In seeking clemency, Hartman's lawyers (along with outside groups) argued that the prosecution had used Hartman's sexuality (he was bisexual) in a discriminatory manner, an argument rejected by the courts and by Governor Mike Easley of North Carolina.

See also
 Capital punishment in North Carolina
 Capital punishment in the United States
 List of people executed in North Carolina
 List of people executed in the United States in 2003

General references
 "State executes convicted killer; Governor denies clemency after U.S. Supreme Court declines to hear case of man who killed housemate," by Matthew Eisley. Raleigh News & Observer, October 3, 2003

1964 births
2003 deaths
People executed for murder
21st-century executions of American people
21st-century executions by North Carolina
People executed by North Carolina by lethal injection
People convicted of murder by North Carolina
American people convicted of murder